The BL 5-inch guns Mk I – Mk V were early British 5-inch rifled breechloading naval guns after it switched from rifled muzzle-loaders in the late 1870s. They were originally designed to use the old gunpowder propellants. The 5-inch calibre was soon discontinued in favour of QF 4.7-inch.

Naval service 

Guns equipped the following British warships :
 s of 1883
 s of 1883
 s as re-gunned in the 1880s
 s laid down in 1885
  third class cruiser/corvettes of 1883–1884
 s as re-gunned in 1888
 s of 1889
 s as re-gunned in the 1880s

These guns also equipped several small gunboats of Colonial navies of Australia in the 1880s in response to the perceived threat of Russian expansionism in the Pacific (The "Russian scares").

Second Boer War (1899–1902) field gun 

A number of guns mounted on carriages from obsolete RML 40 pounder guns accompanied the British siege train (heavy artillery) to South Africa. They were not required for the expected siege of Pretoria, which did not eventuate. Its usefulness in the field was limited by lack of a recoil control system, and the QF 4.7-inch gun was the most commonly used British heavy gun in the war.

Coast defence gun 

The gun was installed as a conventional coast defence gun in South Africa and Australia, and several in the United Kingdom. Its more common use ashore in the UK was as "moveable armaments" in forts: on 2-wheeled carriages similar to field carriages but intended only for moving short distances to position guns for defence of the fort. These used either obsolete 40-pounder RML carriages or special high-mounting carriages for firing over parapets with recoil controlled by a hydraulic buffer built into the platform to which the carriage was fastened. A number were also set up in practise batteries adjacent to fortifications and batteries.

Ammunition 

The gun was designed to fire a number of different types of projectile. Common shell could be used against earthworks, buildings and other vehicles and artillery. Shrapnel shell was designed for use against soft targets, such as troops or cavalry, at longer ranges – for soft targets within 400 yards case shot could be used. Palliser shot was designed for use against hard targets, such as enemy ships, where it could penetrate armour plate.

Initially, the gun used black powder propellant, but this was changed for Cordite propellant in the 1890s. Similarly, the black powder filling for common shells was changed for the much more powerful Lyddite filling, which increased the effect of the shell.

See also 
 List of naval guns

Surviving examples 

 A gun on the deck of HMS Gannet, Chatham, UK.
 2 guns on 40-pounder RML field carriages, outside the Union Buildings, Pretoria, South Africa
 Outside the entrance to the Hong Kong Museum of Coastal Defence
Two guns outside the old school gunnery offices at HMAS Cerberus, Royal Australian Navy training base south of Melbourne, Victoria, Australia
 No. 479 on Vavasseur mount at Queens Park, Maryborough, Queensland, Australia,
 A gun on Vavasseur mount at The Esplanade, Cairns, Queensland, Australia 
A gun on Vavasseur mount at the Maritime Museum of Townsville, Queensland, Australia

Notes

References

Bibliography 
 Text Book of Gunnery, 1887. LONDON : PRINTED FOR HIS MAJESTY'S STATIONERY OFFICE, BY HARRISON AND SONS, ST. MARTIN'S LANE 
 Text Book of Gunnery, 1902. LONDON : PRINTED FOR HIS MAJESTY'S STATIONERY OFFICE, BY HARRISON AND SONS, ST. MARTIN'S LANE 
 Major D Hall, The South African Military History Society. Military History Journal – Vol 2 No 3 June 1972. Guns in South Africa 1899–1902 Part V and VI
 I.V.Hogg & L.F. Thurston, British Artillery Weapons & Ammunition 1914–1918. London: Ian Allan, 1972.

External links 

 Handbook of the 5-inch B.L. gun marks iv and v land service, 1890, 1895, 1903 at State Library of Victoria
 Handbook of the 5-inch b.l. gun marks IV and V on carriage disappearing 8-feet parapet India 1898 at State Library of Victoria
 Handbook of the 5-inch B.L. gun marks I-V land service 1904 at State Library of Victoria.
 Instructions for 5-inch Rifled Breech Loading Armstrong Gun and Elswick Hydro-Pneumatic Disappearing Carriage at Australian National Archives
 Diagram showing gun on siege carriage at Victorian Forts and Artillery website
 Tony DiGiulian, British 5"/25 (12.7 cm) BL Marks I, II, III, IV and V

Naval guns of the United Kingdom
127 mm artillery
Coastal artillery
Victorian-era weapons of the United Kingdom